Institut Supérieur du Design (ISD) Rubika is a French school of design located at two sites, in Valenciennes (France) and in Pune (India). It was founded by the Chamber of Commerce and Industry of Grand Hainaut  in 1987.

History 
ISD Rubika was founded in 1987 at Valenciennes, aiming to train designers to work in manufacturing and mass retail companies. 

Since 1987, ISD is a member of ACM SIGGRAPH.

Organisation 
ISD is part of Rubika, a consortium of institutes including Supinfocom and Supinfogame. Rubika has campuses in Canada, France and India. It offers professional certificates in Management in Engineering Design, Product Design and transports design in five years.

Research 

ISD’s Research-Transfer-Innovation unit conducts about 50 applied research projects every year with industrial, commercial and scientific partners. The other field of applied research concerns engineering pedagogy, developed on the basis of industrial forecasting, the evolution of tools and methods of product conception and mobility systems for goods and passengers. ISD has a ‘laboratory collaboration’ agreement with the Engineering Pedagogy lab of the ISEN Group.

Students 
Rubika has about 1200 students.

References

External links
 Official Website
 Rubika Website
 DSKIC Official Website
  Product Development Website

Educational institutions established in 1987
Design schools in India
1987 establishments in France